The Frascati Tokamak Upgrade (FTU) is a tokamak operating at Frascati, Italy. Building on the Frascati Tokamak experiment, FTU is a compact, high-magnetic-field tokamak (Btor = 8 Tesla ). It began operation in 1990 and has since achieved operating goals of 1.6 MA at 8 T and average electron density greater than 4 per cubic meter. 
The poloidal section of FTU is circular, with a limiter.

External links
Official website 

Tokamaks
Science and technology in Italy